The Cowboys–Eagles rivalry is a  year-long intra-divisional rivalry between the Dallas Cowboys and Philadelphia Eagles of the National Football League (NFL), with the two teams contained in the same division since 1961.

The rivalry has been ranked number one overall in the NFL in 1992 and 2014, characterized by bitterly contested games that are typical of the NFC East. The Cowboys lead the overall series, but the Eagles gained the upper hand during the 1960s and 2000s before the Cowboys reasserted their dominance. The matchups have been the most frequently featured on NBC Sunday Night Football with a total of 16; the series is currently tied at 8–8. The teams have also met in the playoffs four times, with the Cowboys holding a 3–1 advantage.

Notable moments 
On November 12, 1979, Tony Franklin kicked what was then the longest field goal in Eagles history, 59 yards, to help the Eagles win their first-ever game at Texas Stadium, 31–21 (the kick has since been bettered by Jake Elliott's 61-yard kick in 2017). The Eagles were on a three-game losing streak when they went to Dallas for the Monday Night Football game and things did not look promising when quarterback Ron Jaworski was knocked out, but back-up John Walton threw a touchdown pass to Charlie Smith and Franklin kicked the long field goal that Landry said took the juice out right before the half.
 1980 NFC Championship Game, January 11, 1981 – After losing to the Cowboys in all but 3 games from 1967–1979, the Eagles finished first in the NFC East in 1980 due to tie-breaking procedures (both teams 12–4 and splitting the meetings between each other, but the Eagles scored more points) and claimed the division, missed out on the #1 seed in the NFC (the latter proved inconsequential due to seeding restrictions and Dallas defeating Atlanta). Following 14-point deficits overcome by both teams in their respective Divisional playoff victories lead up to the 1980 NFC Championship Game, which was also called the "Blue Jersey Game", on the account that the Eagles, having the choice as the home team, made the Cowboys wear their seemingly cursed blue jerseys (a stigma that dated back to Super Bowl V). To the cheers of a roaring Veterans Stadium crowd, the Eagles defeated the Cowboys 20–7.
 The 1987 NFL season – With many of the Cowboys players crossing the picket line during the strike, Dallas humiliated the replacement-laden Eagles 41–22. Buddy Ryan accused Tom Landry of running up the score (something Buddy Ryan had accused him of before), and Ryan had his heart set on revenge. With little time remaining and the Eagles up by ten, Randall Cunningham faked a kneel down and tossed a long pass into the end zone, resulting in a pass interference call. With the Eagles at the one, a final touchdown made the score 37–20.
 The Bounty Bowls (I and II) and – The two 1989 meetings were nicknamed the Bounty Bowls, due to the accusation by Cowboys head coach Jimmy Johnson that the Eagles had set a bounty on Dallas players, particularly quarterback Troy Aikman and kicker Luis Zendejas. In the second game at Veterans Stadium, Eagles fans threw snowballs, ice, and beer onto the field. Several game participants were targeted, including back judge Al Jury and Cowboys punter Mike Saxon (both struck by snowballs), as well as Cowboys head coach Jimmy Johnson, who was hit with objects as he was escorted off the field by the Philadelphia Police Department. The Eagles won both Bounty Bowl games; 27–0 in Dallas and 20–10 in Philadelphia.
In October 1990, the Eagles and Cowboys met for what became known as the "Porkchop Bowl". The week before game day in Dallas, Philadelphia head coach Buddy Ryan and Ted Plumb, his offensive coordinator were out for dinner. Ryan was dining on pork chops and started to choke. Plumb quickly initiated the Heimlich maneuver and saved Ryan's life. Word of the incident spread in Dallas, and hatred by Cowboys fans was so fevered towards Ryan that former Cowboys' president Tex Schramm dubbed the pending game on October 28 the "Porkchop Bowl." When the game began, Cowboys fans tossed pork chops and similar simulated meat products from the stands toward the Eagles bench.
 1991 regular season – The Eagles began the 1991 season by defeating the Cowboys 24–0 in Dallas in Week 3. During that game, the Eagles set a record with 11 sacks of Cowboys quarterback Troy Aikman. Meanwhile, riding a three-game winning streak, Dallas entered Veterans Stadium in Week 16 with a chance at a playoff berth. The Cowboys benefited from Eagles quarterback Randall Cunningham being injured and rode a Kelvin Martin punt return for a touchdown to a 25–13 victory. The loss eliminated the Eagles from the playoff picture.
 1992–1995 – The Eagles started the 1992 season 5–0 and met the undefeated Cowboys on Monday Night Football. En route to a 31–7 win, the Eagles' number one-ranked defense held the Cowboys' offense to one first-quarter touchdown. However, later that year, Dallas ousted Philadelphia from the divisional round in a 34–10 rout at Texas Stadium.  Three years later, the Cowboys bounced the Eagles from the divisional round of the playoffs a second time, winning 30–11. Dallas eventually advanced to, and won, the Super Bowl in both seasons. The Cowboys' win over the Eagles in the 1995 NFC Divisional playoffs currently marks Dallas' last appearances in both the NFC Championship Game and the Super Bowl.
 October 31, 1993: In the middle of a rainstorm on Halloween, Emmitt Smith ran for 237 yards; setting a Cowboys record for most yards by a running back in a single game as the Cowboys won 23–10. 
 In November 1996, with the Eagles leading at 24–21, James Willis made a memorable play in what was a relatively unmemorable career as an Eagles linebacker when he intercepted a Troy Aikman pass in the end zone and lateraled the ball to Troy Vincent who took it the distance to complete a 104-yard touchdown. The Eagles would go on to win 31–21.
 Trailing by one point, the Eagles were a short field goal on the last play of the game from defeating the Cowboys at Texas Stadium on September 15, 1997.  Punter Tom Hutton could not handle the snap for kicker Chris Boniol and, after a brief scramble, was tackled by the Dallas defense to secure a 21–20 Cowboys victory.
 On October 10, 1999, Dallas wide receiver Michael Irvin suffered a career-ending spinal cord injury while playing at Veterans Stadium. The crowd cheered when Irvin did not get up and chanted "Deion sucks" when Irvin's teammate, Deion Sanders, consoled him. The Cowboys went on to lose the game, 13–10.
 In September 2000, the Eagles and Cowboys met in what would later become known as the "Pickle Juice" game. With temperatures at 109+ degrees, the Eagles pulled their players off the field and had the players drink pickle juice to prevent cramping, a practice the club had begun during training camp as a means to combat both dehydration and cramping. The experiment proved to be a success as the Eagles handed the Cowboys their worst opening day loss since 1963: defeating them by a score of 41–14.
In September 2002, during their final home opener at Veterans Stadium, the Eagles overcame a slow start and blasted the Dallas Cowboys 44–13. The defense collected four turnovers and sacked Quincy Carter four times. This marked the highest point total for an Eagles team that would finish the season with 415 points: the most they've ever scored in franchise history.
 October 12, 2003: In Week 6 of the 2003 season, the 2–2 Eagles met the 3–1 Cowboys and fell to them 23–21; their first loss to the Cowboys since 1999. One of the most notable moments during that game occurred during the opening kickoff. Andy Reid had tried an onside kick to start the game; however, Cowboys head coach Bill Parcells, was not fooled and the gamble blew up in Philadelphia's face. Randal Williams fielded the bouncing kick and raced into the end zone untouched in three seconds – the fastest touchdown in NFL history.
 December 2003: In their first meeting at Lincoln Financial Field, the Eagles crushed the Bill Parcells-led Cowboys 36–10. The Eagles defense held the Cowboys to 150 yards rushing, collected 3 sacks of quarterback Quincy Carter, forced two interceptions and a safety.
 November 15, 2004: In a Monday Night Football game that is probably more remembered for a controversial pre-game promotion featuring Terrell Owens and Desperate Housewives actress Nicollette Sheridan, the Eagles throttled the Cowboys in Texas Stadium, 49–21. In addition, Eagles quarterback Donovan McNabb redefined pocket presence by eluding Cowboys defenders for 14 seconds on one notable play before launching a 60 yard pass to Freddie Mitchell. At the time, this was the highest scoring game in the Eagles-Cowboys rivalry and was the highest point total ever for a visiting team at Texas Stadium.
5 weeks later, on December 19, 2004; the Eagles and Cowboys met again in a defensive struggle in which an Eagles' victory would clinch home field advantage. The Eagles won 12–7 and having what was; at the time their best season in franchise history at 13–3. Unfortunately, this game also turned sour in the third quarter when Roy Williams made a horse-collar tackle on Terrell Owens, breaking his ankle. He was later ruled out until Super Bowl XXXIX.
In Week 5 of the 2005 season, quarterback Drew Bledsoe needed only four plays to lead the Cowboys to a touchdown to open the game. The Eagles defense made a nice goal-line stand on the Cowboys' next possession, but when Dallas got the ball back, Bledsoe connected with Terry Glenn for a 38-yard score, Glenn's second touchdown. A José Cortéz field goal left the Eagles in another 17–0 hole. Donovan McNabb and the Eagles managed a field goal on their first drive of the second quarter, but there would be no comeback this week. Bledsoe tossed another touchdown pass, this one to Lousaka Polite, making it 24–3 Dallas. Bledsoe led the Cowboys to field-goal drives to end the half and to start the third quarter, leaving the Eagles behind 30–3. The only bright moment of the game for Philadelphia was Lito Sheppard stripping receiver Keyshawn Johnson of the ball in the third quarter and Sheldon Brown recovering and racing 80 yards for the touchdown, Brown's second defensive touchdown in as many weeks. The Eagles were held to a paltry 129 offensive yards in the embarrassing 33–10 loss and their pass defense was mauled by Bledsoe. Even worse was to come for the Eagles five weeks later.
In Week 10 of the 2005 season, the Eagles welcomed the Cowboys to Lincoln Financial Field needing a win to keep any playoff hopes alive. They limped into this game 4–4, and had already lost to the Cowboys 33–10 in Week 5. In addition, two weeks prior to this game, the Eagles dismissed Terrell Owens due to inappropriate comments he made about Donovan McNabb and the organization following their loss to the Denver Broncos. The Eagles appeared to be in control, as they held a 20–7 lead late in the game following 2 rushing touchdowns from Brian Westbrook and Donovan McNabb. But with 4 minutes to go in the 4th quarter, the Cowboys scored on a Drew Bledsoe to Terry Glenn touchdown to cut the lead to 20–14. And with less than 3 minutes to go, then came the nail in the coffin, as Donovan McNabb threw an interception to Roy Williams who returned the ball 45 yards for a touchdown and a 21–20 lead. To make matters worse, the Eagles quarterback re-injured his sports hernia attempting to make the tackle. Backup Mike McMahon came in and got the Eagles into Dallas territory, but a go-ahead 60-yard kick from David Akers failed. The Eagles would later finish the season 6–10; while the Cowboys would finish 9–7. Furthermore, the Eagles became the first team in NFL history to be swept by all of their divisional opponents after sweeping them in the prior season. 
 On October 8, 2006, wide receiver Terrell Owens, who had previously played for the Eagles, played his first game in Philadelphia as a Cowboy. The Eagles won 38–24 with a late interception return for a touchdown by Lito Sheppard. Owens was held to 3 catches and 45 yards.
On Christmas Day 2006, an amazing December turnaround of the Philadelphia Eagles continued with another road win over their division rival. Philadelphia's surprising 23–7 victory over the Dallas Cowboys not only clinched a playoff spot, but seized control of the NFC East due to their head-to-head tiebreaker over the Cowboys after Dallas squandered their chance to clinch the NFC East themselves and lost any chance of gaining a first-round bye. The following week, a Dallas loss to the Detroit Lions gave the Eagles the NFC East title just minutes into their regular-season finale against the Atlanta Falcons.

In Week 9 of the 2007 season, the division-leading Cowboys handed the Eagles a decisive 38–17 loss on NBC Sunday Night Football in Philadelphia. One of the most memorable moments of the game was tight end Jason Witten making a 53-yard reception after losing his helmet.
In Week 15 of the 2007 season, with less than 30 seconds left in the game and the Eagles leading 10–6, running back Brian Westbrook, had a 24-yard untouched run for a touchdown, but stopped just short of the end zone and took a knee at the 1-yard line. Quarterback Donovan McNabb took three knees to seal the victory. 
In Week 2 of the 2008 season, the Eagles and Cowboys met in the final Monday Night Football game at Texas Stadium. When the dust settled, The game featured the second-most first-half points in MNF history (54) and most combined points in the rivalry's history (78). The Cowboys beat the Eagles 41–37 in a game that featured 7 lead changes.
 On December 28, 2008, in Week 17 of the 2008 season, the Eagles and Cowboys faced off in Philadelphia with a wild card playoff berth on the line. The winner would claim the sixth and final wild card spot in the NFC, and the loser would be eliminated from playoff contention. This situation was brought about by losses earlier in the day by the Tampa Bay Buccaneers and the Chicago Bears, which kept the Eagles' playoff hopes alive.  The Eagles did not squander the opportunity and took a 27–3 halftime lead on their way to a 44–6 blowout of the Cowboys. It was Terrell Owens' last game as a Cowboy.
In Week 9 of the 2009 NFL season, the Eagles and Cowboys met for their 100th game at Lincoln Financial Field. Both teams came into this game 5–2 and looking to take control of the NFC East. The game was hard fought; with the Cowboys holding a 10–6 lead by halftime only for the Eagles to go up 13–10 in the 3rd quarter. But with just under 8 minutes to go, quarterback Tony Romo threw a 49-yard touchdown pass to Miles Austin midway through the fourth quarter and the Dallas Cowboys held on to beat the Eagles 20–16. 
 On January 3, 2010, in Week 17 of the 2009 season, the Cowboys (10–5) hosted their regular season finale against the Eagles (11–4) in a regular season-sealing claim for the NFC East crown. The Cowboys would win the day, shutting out the Eagles, 24–0. With the victory, the Cowboys would once again reclaim first place in their division and improve to 11–5. The loss dropped the Eagles from being the #2 seed and having a first-round bye, all the way down to the #6 seed, while the Cowboys earned the #3 seed, setting the stage for a rematch in the Wild Card playoffs once again in Dallas. For the third time that year, the Cowboys defeated the Eagles, with a final score of 34–14. The Cowboys and Eagles combined to set an NFL record for the most penalty yards in a playoff game, ever. The two teams were penalized 23 times for 228 yards. This was the last game with the Eagles for quarterback Donovan McNabb, who was traded to the Washington Redskins in the offseason.
 In December 2010, the Eagles defeated the Cowboys in a wild 30–27 win. Philadelphia delivered the game's opening strike with a 1-yard touchdown run from quarterback Michael Vick, but the Cowboys answered with quarterback Jon Kitna completing a 1-yard touchdown pass to tight end Jason Witten. The Eagles regained the lead in the second quarter with Vick locating offensive guard Todd Herremans on a 1-yard touchdown pass. Afterwards, Dallas closed out the half with kicker David Buehler making a 50-yard field goal. The Cowboys took the lead in the third quarter as Buehler got a 43-yard field goal, followed by running back Felix Jones getting a 3-yard touchdown run. Philadelphia struck back with a 39-yard field goal from kicker David Akers. The Eagles tied the game with a 50-yard field goal from Akers, followed by Vick connecting with wide receiver DeSean Jackson on a 91-yard touchdown pass and Akers' 28-yard field goal. Dallas tried to rally as Kitna completed a 22-yard touchdown pass to Witten, yet the Eagles held on for the victory.
In Week 10 of the 2012 season, the Eagles and Cowboys met in what turned out to be an ugly affair for the Eagles. Going into this game, both teams came in with losing records of 3–5 which marked the first time in 22 years both teams met with records that were sub .500. They scored first with Michael Vick hooking up with Riley Cooper on a 2-yard touchdown pass for a 7–0 lead, however, the Cowboys responded with Tony Romo finding Felix Jones on an 11-yard pass for a 7–7 lead. Then increased their lead in the 2nd quarter as Dan Bailey kicked a 30-yard field goal for a 10–7 halftime lead. Michael Vick had been knocked out of the game and was possibly out for the season after going 6/9 for 70 yards and a touchdown pass. Rookie quarterback Nick Foles would get his first NFL action and threw his first touchdown pass to Jeremy Maclin from 44 yards out as the Eagles retook a 14–10 lead while Henery moved the team ahead 17–10 with a 40-yard field goal. After this, the Cowboys went back to work as Romo found Dez Bryant on a 30-yard touchdown pass to tie the game at 17–17. Then the Cowboys retook the lead with Dwayne Harris returned a punt 78-yards for a touchdown for a 24–17 lead followed up by Brandon Carr returning an interception 47 yards for a touchdown and a 31–17 lead. The Eagles then got back to work with Stanley Havili 1-yard touchdown run (with a failed extra point) to shorten the lead to 31–23. But the Cowboys wrapped the game up with Jason Hatcher's fumble recovery in the end zone for a final score of 38–23 in Dallas' favor.
In Week 13 of the 2012 season, the Eagles limped into their second meeting with the Cowboys with a record of 3–8 and looking to keep any hopes of playoff aspirations alive. Unfortunately, a 38–33 loss to the Cowboys secured the Eagles their third losing season since 1999 and their first since 2005. Thus this season became their third losing season under Andy Reid as the Eagles were swept by the Cowboys for the first time since 2009. Also with the loss, the Eagles were mathematically eliminated from playoff contention. The Eagles fired Reid as head coach after the season.
On October 20, 2013, the Eagles and Cowboys met for the first time under new Eagles head coach Chip Kelly at Lincoln Financial Field. In an unexpected defensive tussle, a banged-up defense shut down Kelly's prolific offense and the Cowboys overcame a sluggish start to beat the Philadelphia Eagles 17–3 to take sole possession of first place in the NFC East.
 On December 29, 2013, in Week 17 of the 2013 season, the Eagles and Cowboys faced off in Dallas for the de facto NFC East Championship. The winner would thus claim the third seed in the NFC and the loser would be eliminated from playoff contention. The Eagles won 24–22 on an interception by Brandon Boykin with the Kyle Orton pass intended for Miles Austin. This sealed the victory with 1:43 remaining in the game. Tony Romo missed the game after being injured the previous week. The Eagles handed the Cowboys their third straight Week 17 winner-take-all NFC East title game loss and third straight 8–8 season in as many years having lost to all three division rivals across 2011–2013.
 On December 14, 2014, the Cowboys met the Eagles on NBC Sunday Night Football with both teams at 9–4. The Cowboys took a 21–0 lead early in the 2nd quarter, but the Eagles would score 24 straight points capped off by a Darren Sproles 1-yard run to take a 24–21 lead with 5 minutes left in the third quarter. The Cowboys would however re-take control and win 38–27 to split the season series and take possession of the NFC East lead for the first time in the season. The Eagles, who controlled the division for the entire season, were eliminated from playoff contention the next week.
 On March 12, 2015, former Cowboys running back and reigning NFL rushing champion DeMarco Murray signed with the Eagles. This enraged some Cowboys fans, calling Murray a "traitor". The Cowboys and Eagles met for the first time of the 2015 season in week 2 in Philadelphia. Murray was held to 2 rushing yards on 13 carries. Additionally, the Cowboys would go on to win 20–10; but after Tony Romo was knocked out of the game with a broken collarbone by Eagles rookie linebacker Jordan Hicks, which would keep him out of action for weeks to come.
 On November 8, 2015, the Eagles and Cowboys met in Dallas. Dallas while riding a 5-game losing streak, was still feeling the effects of injured quarterback Tony Romo from the Week 2 game in Philadelphia and the loss of the now Eagles running back DeMarco Murray in the offseason. Philadelphia came in with an underwhelming (3–4) record with questions about their offensive scheme and the direction of head coach Chip Kelly's personnel moves. However, both teams would still find themselves in the thick of the NFC East race with a win, mainly due to the fact that the New York Giants were only 4–4 at the time. Many expected a low scoring defensive battle but that was clearly not the case as the Eagles would win in overtime over the Cowboys 33–27. This quickly became a wild game in Dallas that featured back and forth action between the two teams with their seasons on the line. It would come down to overtime when Sam Bradford threw a touchdown pass to wide receiver Jordan Matthews to seal the Eagles victory. It was the third-straight season split between the two, the third straight time the road team won both games, and the twelfth straight year the road team won at least once in the series.
 On October 30, 2016, the Eagles and Cowboys faced off in a battle of rookie quarterbacks between Carson Wentz and Dak Prescott. Thanks to a fourth quarter rally by Dak Prescott, the Cowboys were able to tie the Eagles at 23–23, sending the game into overtime. Despite a rough start, Prescott finished the game with 287 yards with two touchdowns, including a 5-yard pass to tight end Jason Witten that allowed the Cowboys to defeat the Eagles with a final score of 29–23.
 During the 2017 NFL Draft held in Philadelphia, Drew Pearson trolled the loudly booing local audience by saying "I want to thank the Eagles fans for allowing me to have a career in the NFL!" He pumped his fist as he screamed that he was representing the "five-time Super Bowl champion Dallas Cowboys and Hall of Fame owner Jerry Jones!"
 During the 2018 NFL Draft held at AT&T Stadium, David Akers trolled the loudly booing local audience and one-upped Pearson's jab from the previous year by first saying "What's up, Dallas? We heard you in Philly last year!" and then adding "Tonight! I'm representing the Philadelphia Eagles! NFC East Champs! Divisional Champs! NFC Champs! AND WORLD CHAMPS! THE WORLD CHAMPS! Hey Dallas, the last time you were in the Super Bowl these draft picks weren't born!" before drafting a tight end coincidentally named Dallas Goedert, which the Eagles took away from the Cowboys following the retirement of Cowboys tight end Jason Witten and the Eagles moving up one spot in the draft from 50th overall to 49th overall.
 On December 9, 2018; the Eagles and Cowboys met for their second meeting of the 2018 season. The Cowboys came in on a 4 game winning streak at 7–5 and the struggling Eagles rolled in with a 6–6 record. With the help of three go-ahead touchdowns by Amari Cooper, 455 passing yards from Dak Prescott, and 192 scrimmage yards from Ezekiel Elliott, the Dallas Cowboys won 29–23 in an overtime thriller. As a result, the Cowboys swept the season series over the Eagles, and took a 2 game lead in the division over the Philadelphia Eagles and Washington Redskins after this victory. However, the officiating was scrutinized for numerous bad calls for both teams. On the very first play of the game, the Eagles had attempted an unsuccessful challenge from Doug Pederson for a kickoff fumble that was ultimately not declared a recovery. Second, Ezekiel Elliott drew a never-before called 15-yard helmet-lowering penalty for the hit he put on Eagles safety Corey Graham albeit getting shoved by an Eagles defender. Third, a touchdown courtesy of rookie tight end Dallas Goedert in the third quarter that was overturned thanks to offensive pass interference after he seemed to run into Jeff Heath before catching the ball. Fox Sports analyst and former Vice President of NFL Officiating Mike Pereira noted the hit was within 5 yards of the line of scrimmage and should not have been called. Lastly, Pereira also lambasted a roughing the passer penalty on Randy Gregory during a clear sack of Carson Wentz. In total, the Philadelphia Eagles committed 5 penalties for 49 yards while the Cowboys were called for 11 penalties for 111 yards.
 On October 20, 2019; the Eagles and Cowboys met with identical records of 3–3 looking to take control of the NFC East. Both teams each came off losses the week prior. The Cowboys defeated the Eagles, 37–10. The Cowboys defense forced fumbles on the Eagles' first two drives that the offense turned into two touchdowns, including a strip-sack by DeMarcus Lawrence, which was his first sack against the Eagles in his career. From that point on, the Cowboys never looked back. Later, in a span of three plays in the fourth quarter, both Xavier Woods and Jalen Mills each intercepted passes and Kerry Hyder recovered a fumble from Eagles quarterback Carson Wentz. All told, Carson Wentz had three turnovers – two fumbles and an interception. He finished 16-of-26 for 191 yards with a touchdown as well for an 80.8 quarterback rating. Meanwhile, Dak Prescott finished the game 21-of-27 for 239 yards with a touchdown and an interception for a quarterback rating of 100.5. He put an exclamation point on the night with an 8-yard touchdown run in the fourth quarter.
 On December 22, 2019, at Lincoln Financial Field, an injury-ravaged Eagles team defeated the Cowboys 17–9, avenging their Week 7 loss in Dallas and taking the lead in the NFC East for the first time all season. This defensive duel was sealed late in the 4th quarter when Eagles cornerback Sidney Jones broke up a fourth-down pass intended for Michael Gallup. The victory improved Philadelphia to 8–7. The Eagles would go on to win the division the following week against the New York Giants, eliminating the Cowboys. At the conclusion of the season, the Cowboys chose not to renew head coach Jason Garrett's contract.
In their first meeting during the 2020 season, Wentz and the Eagles bumbled their way to a crucial division win over an injury-ravaged Dallas Cowboys team led by rookie quarterback Ben DiNucci. The Cowboys opened the scoring on the game's opening drive with a 49-yard field goal by Greg Zuerlein. After a fumble by Wentz gave the Cowboys the ball back, the Eagles regained possession on a DiNucci fumble and took a 7–3 lead on Jalen Reagor's first career touchdown reception. The Cowboys responded with another Zuerlein field goal following Wentz's second fumble and took a 9–7 halftime lead on a 59-yard field goal. On the Eagles' second-half opening drive, Wentz would be picked off by Cowboys rookie cornerback Trevon Diggs, who returned the ball to the Dallas 31, but the Cowboys failed to capitalize when Zuerlein's ensuing 52-yard field goal attempt sailed wide right. The Eagles used the momentum swing to regain the lead 15–9 on a 9-yard Travis Fulgham touchdown reception. In the fourth quarter, T.J. Edwards strip-sacked DiNucci, and the ensuing fumble was recovered and returned 53 yards for a touchdown by Rodney McLeod. With the 23–9 win, Philadelphia improved to 3–4–1 on the season heading into their Week 9 bye, while Dallas dropped to 2-6 ahead of a big matchup against the undefeated Pittsburgh Steelers.
The rivals met again at AT&T Stadium on December 27, 2020. The Eagles would dominate the Cowboys in the first quarter, jumping out to a 14–3 lead with touchdowns on each of its first two possessions, including an 81-yard touchdown by DeSean Jackson, his only score of the season. However, Dallas' offense would quickly turn the tables and outscore Philadelphia 34–3 over the final three quarters. A second-quarter stinger injury to Fletcher Cox would prove costly to the Eagles' defense, which allowed 513 total yards on the afternoon. Jalen Hurts turned the ball over three times, one of which led to a Cowboys scoring drive. The Cowboys won the game 37–17 to improve to 6–9 on the season and eliminate the Eagles, who dropped to 4–10–1 with the loss, from playoff contention. This was Dallas' 40th home win and 70th overall win over Philadelphia in the rivalry, including the postseason.
During the 2021 NFL draft, In a rare collaborative move, the Eagles traded a third-round pick and their 12th overall pick for Dallas's 10th overall pick.  The purpose of this trade for the Eagles was to select Heisman Trophy-winning wide receiver DeVonta Smith ahead of fellow divisional rivals, the New York Giants, who were sitting in the 11th spot. This move reportedly made the Giants front office "livid".
 In the week before the clubs' 2021 week 3 Monday Night Football matchup in Dallas, new Eagles head coach Nick Sirianni wore a T-shirt with the words "Beat Dallas" to a mid-week press conference.  When asked about the shirt, he stated, "I can't tell you how many times since I've been here having an interaction with a fan, it's, like, 'Hey, beat Dallas.' And I think that's really cool. I think that's awesome. So really love the fact that I'm able to partake in this rivalry. The bulletin board material sparked the Cowboys to decimate the visiting Eagles 41-21 in a very one-sided game. After the game, the Dallas Cowboys media team uploaded a photoshopped image of Nick Sirianni's shirt with the edit of "Beat by Dallas." on the team's Twitter account.
 In a Week 6 NBC Sunday Night Football matchup in 2022 to determine first place in the division, the Eagles continued their unbeaten streak, outlasting the Cowboys 26–17 and handing Dallas backup quarterback Cooper Rush his first loss as a starter in the NFL. In the game's closing seconds, Dallas defensive lineman Osa Odighizuwa responded to getting blocked by Eagles center Jason Kelce after the whistle by tackling him, drawing a penalty for unnecessary roughness and essentially ending the game. Eagles head coach Nick Sirianni was furious and was clearly seen pointing and yelling ‘F*** you!’ — and he wasn’t done there. While walking down the tunnel towards the locker room at the Lincoln Financial Field, Sirianni approached a camera and mocked the Cowboys' cheer by shouting, ‘How ‘bout them Eagles? 
On Christmas Eve 2022, the Eagles traveled to Dallas for an opportunity to clinch the #1 seed in the NFC for the first time since 2017 and their first division title since 2019. Backup quarterback Gardner Minshew started the Eagles' road finale against the arch-rival Cowboys in place of Jalen Hurts, who was sitting out due to the shoulder injury he sustained the prior week against Chicago. Despite a solid performance by Minshew, Philadelphia was doomed by a season-high four turnovers, all of which led to scoring drives for Dallas, in what turned out to be a high-scoring slugfest. Trailing 40–34 late in the game, Minshew attempted to lead the Eagles on a go-ahead drive into Cowboys territory, but a fourth-down pass would fall incomplete, sealing Philadelphia's first and ultimately only road loss of the season. With the loss, the Eagles fell to 13–2.

Season-by-season results 

|-
| 
| style="| 
| style="| Eagles  27–25
| no game
| Eagles  1–0
| Cowboys join NFL as an expansion team.  The teams only played one game as Cowboys were placed in the Western Division and Eagles were in the Eastern division.  Eagles win 1960 NFL Championship.
|-
| 
| style="| 
| style="| Eagles  43–17
| style="| Eagles  35–13
| Eagles  3–0 
| Cowboys moved to the Eastern Division with the addition of the Minnesota Vikings to the NFL.  The Cowboys and Eagles would play two games annually beginning in 1961.
|-
| 
| Tie 1–1
| style="| Cowboys  41–19
| style="| Eagles  28–14
| Eagles  4–1
| 
|-
| 
| Tie 1–1
| style="| Cowboys  27–20
| style="| Eagles  24–21
| Eagles  5–2
| 
|-
| 
| style="| 
| style="| Eagles  17–14
| style="| Eagles  24–14
| Eagles  7–2 
| 
|-
| 
| Tie 1–1
| style="| Eagles  35–24
| style="| Cowboys  21–19
| Eagles  8–3
| 
|-
| 
| Tie 1–1
| style="| Cowboys  56–7
| style="| Eagles  24–23
| Eagles  9–4
| Cowboys lose 1966 NFL Championship.
|-
| 
| Tie 1–1
| style="| Cowboys  38–17
| style="| Eagles  21–14
| Eagles  10–5
| Cowboys lose 1967 NFL Championship.
|-
| 
| style="| 
| style="| Cowboys  34–14
| style="| Cowboys  45–13
| Eagles  10–7
| 
|-
| 
| style="| 
| style="| Cowboys  49–14
| style="| Cowboys  38–7
| Eagles  10–9
|

|-
| 
| style="| 
| style="| Cowboys  21–17
| style="| Cowboys  17–7
| Cowboys  11–10
| Both teams placed in the NFC East after AFL-NFL merger. Cowboys lose Super Bowl V.
|-
| 
| style="| 
| style="| Cowboys  20–7
| style="| Cowboys  42–7
| Cowboys  13–10
| Cowboys open Texas Stadium, Eagles open Veterans Stadium, Cowboys win Super Bowl VI.
|-
| 
| style="| 
| style="| Cowboys  28–6
| style="| Cowboys  28–7
| Cowboys  15–10
| Cowboys win 11 straight meetings (1967–72).
|-
| 
| Tie 1–1
| style="| Cowboys  31–10
| style="| Eagles  30–16
| Cowboys  16–11
| 
|-
| 
| Tie 1–1
| style="| Cowboys  31–24
| style="| Eagles  13–10
| Cowboys  17–12
| 
|-
| 
| style="| 
| style="| Cowboys  27–17
| style="| Cowboys  20–17
| Cowboys  19–12
| Cowboys lose Super Bowl X.
|-
| 
| style="| 
| style="| Cowboys  27–7
| style="| Cowboys  26–7
| Cowboys  21–12
| 
|-
| 
| style="| 
| style="| Cowboys  24–14
| style="| Cowboys  16–10
| Cowboys  23–12
| Cowboys win Super Bowl XII.
|-
| 
| style="| 
| style="| Cowboys  14–7
| style="| Cowboys  31–13
| Cowboys  25–12
| Cowboys win 9 straight meetings (1974–78) and 13 straight meetings at home (1966–78), Cowboys lose Super Bowl XIII.
|-
| 
| Tie 1–1
| style="| Eagles  31–21
| style="| Cowboys  24–17
| Cowboys  26–13
| 
|-

|-
| 
| Tie 1–1
| style="| Cowboys  35–27
| style="| Eagles  17–10
| Cowboys  27–14
| Eagles clinch NFC East despite their week 17 loss in Dallas due to the net points in division games tiebreaker, and not losing to Dallas by at least 25 points. Eagles lose Super Bowl XV.
|-  style="background:#f2f2f2; font-weight:bold;"
|  1980 Playoffs
| style="| 
| 
| style="| Eagles  20–7
|  Cowboys  27–15
|  NFC Championship Game. 
|-
| 
| style="| 
| style="| Cowboys  21–10
| style="| Cowboys  17–14
| Cowboys  29–15
|
|-
| 
| style="| 
| style="| Eagles  24–20
| no game
| Cowboys  29–16
| Game in Philadelphia cancelled due to players strike.
|-
| 
| style="| 
| style="| Cowboys  37–7
| style="| Cowboys  27–20
| Cowboys  31–16
| 
|-
| 
| style="| 
| style="| Cowboys  23–17
| style="| Cowboys  26–10
| Cowboys  33–16
| 
|-
| 
| Tie 1–1
| style="| Cowboys  34–17
| style="| Eagles  16–14
| Cowboys  34–17
| 
|-
| 
| Tie 1–1
| style="| Eagles  23–21
| style="| Cowboys  17–14
| Cowboys  35–18
| 
|-
| 
| Tie 1–1
| style="| Cowboys  41–22
| style="| Eagles  37–20
| Cowboys  36–19
|
|-
| 
| style="| 
| style="| Eagles  23–7
| style="| Eagles  24–23
| Cowboys  36–21
| Eagles’ first season sweep since 1964. Eagles overcome a 20–0 deficit to win in their meeting in Philadelphia. Eagles clinch a playoff berth with their win in Dallas, along with the NFC East with the Giants loss. Meeting in Dallas would be Tom Landry's final game as Cowboys' head coach.
|-
| 
| style="| 
| style="| Eagles  27–0
| style="| Eagles  20–10
| Cowboys  36–23
| The meetings in 1989 became known as the Bounty Bowls due to accusations that Eagles coaches had set a bounty to knock out Cowboys players. Game in Dallas was played on Thanksgiving Day.
|-

|-
| 
| style="| 
| style="| Eagles  21–20
| style="| Eagles 17–3
| Cowboys  36–25
| 
|-
| 
| Tie 1–1
| style="| Eagles  24–0
| style="| Cowboys  25–13
| Cowboys  37–26
| Eagles win 8 straight meetings (1987–91). Eagles sack Troy Aikman 11 times in Dallas. Cowboys' win in Philadelphia clinches wild card berth while eliminating the Eagles from playoff contention.
|-
| 
| Tie 1–1
| style="| Cowboys  20–10
| style="| Eagles  31–7
| Cowboys  38–27
| Cowboys win Super Bowl XXVII.
|- style="background:#f2f2f2; font-weight:bold;"
|  1992 Playoffs
| style="| 
| style="| Cowboys  34–10
| 
|  Cowboys  39–27
|  NFC Divisional Round.
|-
| 
| style="| 
| style="| Cowboys  23–17
| style="| Cowboys  23–10
| Cowboys  41–27
| Cowboys win Super Bowl XXVIII.
|-
| 
| style="| 
| style="| Cowboys  24–13
| style="| Cowboys  31–19
| Cowboys  43–27
| 
|-
| 
| Tie 1–1
| style="| Cowboys  34–12
| style="| Eagles  20–17
| Cowboys  44–28
| Cowboys win 7 straight meetings (1992–95). Eagles' home win comes after the Cowboys failed to convert 4th & 1 twice inside their own 30–yard line. Cowboys win Super Bowl XXX.
|- style="background:#f2f2f2; font-weight:bold;"
|  1995 Playoffs
| style="| 
| style="| Cowboys  30–11
| 
|  Cowboys  45–28
|  NFC Divisional Round.
|-
| 
| Tie 1–1
| style="| Eagles  31–21
| style="| Cowboys  23–19
| Cowboys  46–29
|  
|-
| 
| Tie 1–1
| style="| Cowboys  21–20
| style="| Eagles  13–12
| Cowboys  47–30
| Eagles lose in Dallas after an erroneous snap on a potential game-winning field goal from short range.
|-
| 
| style="| 
| style="| Cowboys  13–9
| style="| Cowboys  34–0
| Cowboys  49–30
| 
|-
| 
| Tie 1–1
| style="| Cowboys  20–10
| style="| Eagles  13–10
| Cowboys  50–31
| Michael Irvin plays his last career game in Philadelphia.
|-

|-
| 
| style="| 
| style="| Eagles  41–14
| style="| Eagles 16–13(OT)
| Cowboys  50–33
| Game in Dallas is known as the "Pickle Juice" game. Eagles' first season sweep since 1990.
|-
| 
| style="| 
| style="| Eagles  36–3
| style="| Eagles 40–18
| Cowboys  50–35
| 
|-
| 
| style="| 
| style="| Eagles  27–3
| style="| Eagles 44–13
| Cowboys  50–37
| 
|-
| 
| Tie 1–1
| style="| Cowboys  23–21
| style="| Eagles  36–10
| Cowboys  51–38
| Eagles open Lincoln Financial Field.
|-
| 
| style="| 
| style="| Eagles  49–21
| style="| Eagles  12–7
| Cowboys  51–40
| Eagles lose Super Bowl XXXIX.
|-
| 
| style="| 
| style="| Cowboys  33–10
| style="| Cowboys  21–20
| Cowboys  53–40
|
|-
| 
| style="| 
| style="| Eagles  23–7
| style="| Eagles  38–24
| Cowboys  53–42
| Terrell Owens makes first return to Philadelphia. Eagles deny the Cowboys the NFC East title and instead take control of the division themselves while clinching a playoff berth in game in Dallas on Christmas.
|-
| 
| Tie 1–1
| style="| Eagles  10–6
| style="| Cowboys  38–17
| Cowboys  54–43
| 
|-
| 
| Tie 1–1
| style="| Cowboys  41–37
| style="| Eagles  44–6
| Cowboys  55–44
| Game in Philadelphia was final game of the regular season with the winner claiming the final wild card spot and the loser missing the playoffs.  The Eagles would win and get into the playoffs, while handing Dallas their ninth straight week 17 loss.
|-
| 
| style="| 
| style="| Cowboys  24–0
| style="| Cowboys  20–16
| Cowboys  57–44
| Cowboys open AT&T Stadium (then known as Cowboys Stadium).  Game in Dallas was final game of the regular season with the winner clinching the NFC East. Cowboys won the NFC East and the #3 seed, while the Eagles fell to the #6 seed.
|- style="background:#f2f2f2; font-weight:bold;"
|  2009 Playoffs
| style="| 
| style="| Cowboys  34–14
| 
|  Cowboys  58–44
|  NFC Wild Card Round.  Game played one week after two teams met to conclude regular season. Donovan McNabb's last game as an Eagle.
|-

|-
| 
| Tie 1–1
| style="| Eagles  30–27
| style="| Cowboys  14–13
| Cowboys  59–45
| 
|-
| 
| style="| 
| style="| Eagles  20–7
| style="| Eagles  34–7
| Cowboys  59–47
| 
|-
| 
| style="| 
| style="| Cowboys  38–33
| style="| Cowboys  38–23
| Cowboys  61–47
| Cowboys rally from early deficit in Dallas to eliminate Philadelphia from playoff contention.
|-
| 
| Tie 1–1
| style="| Eagles  24–22
| style="| Cowboys  17–3
| Cowboys  62–48
| Game in Dallas was final game of the regular season with the winner clinching the NFC East. Eagles won to clinch the division, eliminating the Cowboys from the playoffs to an NFC East rival in week 17 for the third consecutive year.
|-
| 
| Tie 1–1
| style="| Eagles  33–10
| style="| Cowboys  38–27
| Cowboys  63–49
| Game in Dallas occurred on Thanksgiving. Game in Philadelphia occurred two weeks later. Both games were for sole possession of first place in the NFC East.
|-
| 
| Tie 1–1
| style="| Eagles  33–27(OT)
| style="| Cowboys  20–10
| Cowboys  64–50
| Visiting team wins six straight games (2013–15).
|-
| 
| Tie 1–1
| style="| Cowboys  29–23(OT)
| style="| Eagles  27–13
| Cowboys  65–51
| 
|-
| 
| Tie 1–1
| style="| Eagles  37–9
| style="| Cowboys  6–0
| Cowboys  66–52
| Eagles win Super Bowl LII.
|-
| 
| style="| 
| style="| Cowboys  29–23(OT)
| style="| Cowboys  27–20
| Cowboys  68–52
| 
|-
| 
| Tie 1–1
| style="| Cowboys  37–10
| style="| Eagles  17–9
| Cowboys  69–53
| Game in Philadelphia was the de facto NFC East championship. The Eagles proceeded to win and gain control of the NFC East, which the Eagles would clinch the next week.
|-

|-
| 
| Tie 1–1
| style="| Cowboys  37–17
| style="| Eagles  23–9
| Cowboys  70–54
| Due to Cowboys QB Dak Prescott's season-ending injury, it was the first games in the rivalry since 2015 without Prescott. Game in Philadelphia was Carson Wentz's final start in this rivalry. Cowboys' win in Dallas eliminates the Eagles from playoff contention.
|-
| 
| style="| 
| style="| Cowboys  41–21
| style="| Cowboys  51–26
| Cowboys  72–54
| Game in Dallas was Dak Prescott's first home game since his ankle injury. The game in Philadelphia involved Dak Prescott's first-ever 5-touchdown game.
|-
| 
| Tie 1–1
| style="| Cowboys  40–34
| style="| Eagles  26–17 
| Cowboys  73–55
| Both games involved the loser playing without their respective starting quarterbacks, Dak Prescott and Jalen Hurts, due to injury. Game in Dallas was played on Christmas Eve, the first game played on Christmas Eve between the two teams since 2011. Eagles lose Super Bowl LVII.
|- 

|-
| Regular season
| style="|
| Cowboys 39–24
| Cowboys 31–30
|
|-
| Postseason
| style="|
| Cowboys 3–0
| Eagles 1–0
| NFC Wild Card playoffs: 2009. NFC Divisional playoffs: 1992, 1995. NFC Championship Game: 1980.
|-
| Regular and postseason 
| style="|
| Cowboys 42–24
| Tied 31–31
| 
|-

References 

National Football League rivalries
Dallas Cowboys
Philadelphia Eagles
Dallas Cowboys rivalries
Philadelphia Eagles rivalries